Midway Arcade Treasures 3 is the third and final compilation of classic arcade games published by Midway Games for the GameCube, PlayStation 2, and Xbox. This compilation includes 8 racing games that were not in the 2003 and 2004 releases Midway Arcade Treasures and Midway Arcade Treasures 2. Like the first and second installments, however, the Xbox version is not compatible with the Xbox 360. Unlike the other installments in the Midway Arcade Treasures series, it is rated E for Everyone by the ESRB. It also differs from the other installments by focusing on one specific genre (3D racing games), while the first two featured games from a wide variety of genres.

Games
The games included in Midway Arcade Treasures 3 are:

Badlands
Offroad Thunder
Race Drivin'
San Francisco Rush the Rock: Alcatraz Edition
S.T.U.N. Runner
Super Off Road (including its upgrade/add-on pack, Super Off Road Track Pack)
Hydro Thunder
San Francisco Rush 2049

While most of the games in this collection are emulations or recreations of the arcade versions, Hydro Thunder and Rush 2049 are based on the console versions, specifically ports of the Dreamcast releases. Additionally, San Francisco Rush: The Rock was re-programmed from the ground up; while the tracks and vehicles are the same as the arcade version, the physics engine is slightly different, and the music has been replaced, save for the "What's Your Name?" high score music. However, this version runs at 60 frames per second, which is faster than the arcade.

Super Off Road and its Track Pack is the only game on this collection, and in the entire trilogy, that was not developed by Midway, Williams Electronics, or Atari Games. It was developed and published by the Leland Corporation, the predecessor of Midway Studios San Diego, which was acquired as part of the purchase of Tradewest in 1994. For legal reasons, the image of "Ironman" Ivan Stewart has been altered in the two Super Off Road games; he now has sunglasses and a mustache and both games are now known as simply Super Off Road (the original arcade versions were known fully as Ironman Ivan Stewart's Super Off Road). "Ironman's" Speed Shop was renamed Off-Road Speed Shop, and Ivan himself (the gray, AI-controlled racer) was renamed "Lightning" Kevin Lydy. Ivan's name does, however, remain intact on the high score list ("IVN") and game credits.

Reception

Midway Arcade Treasures 3 received mixed reviews with 66.05% for the PlayStation 2 version, 67.29% for the Xbox version, and 65.61% for the GameCube version from video game aggregator GameRankings.

References

External links 

2005 video games
GameCube games
Midway video game compilations
PlayStation 2 games
Video games developed in the United States
Xbox games